Welshpool Station is a railway station on the Transperth network. It is located on the Armadale/Thornlie Line, 9.5 kilometres from Perth Station serving the suburbs of Welshpool and Bentley, Western Australia.

The station is planned to close in 2023 as part of a wider upgrade to the line.

History
Welshpool Station opened in 1889 as one of the original stations on the Armadale Line.

Welshpool Station was planned to be closed under the original 1999 South West Metropolitan Railway Master Plan for the Armadale line branch route of the Mandurah line to enable the construction of a bridge over Welshpool Road instead of the current level crossing. However, with the change in route alignment, the closure was no longer necessary at that point in time.

Future
The station is planned to close as part of a Metronet project for the removal of level crossings on the Armadale Line. The project involves the removal of the Welshpool Road level crossing. Because Welshpool Station does not have high patronage, and it is close to Welshpool Road and a bridge that Leach Highway goes over, it was determined that it was not possible to remove the Welshpool Road level crossing without closing Welshpool Station.

Services
Welshpool Station is served by Transperth Armadale/Thornlie Line services.

The station saw 116,681 passengers in the 2013-14 financial year.

Platforms

References

Bibliography

External links
Gallery History of Western Australian Railways & Stations

Armadale and Thornlie lines
Railway stations in Perth, Western Australia
Railway stations in Australia opened in 1889